Hayley Moffatt (born 10 August 1985) is an Australian basketball player, who currently plays for the Sydney Uni Flames in the WNBL.

Career

WNBL
Moffatt began her WNBL career with the West Coast Waves in 2012. For the following season, she returned home to Queensland and signed with the Logan Thunder. After the team left the league, Moffatt was joined the Sydney Uni Flames. Moffatt has re-signed with the Flames for the 2016–17 season, her third consecutive season in Sydney.

References

1985 births
Living people
Australian women's basketball players
Guards (basketball)
Sportswomen from Queensland
Sydney Uni Flames players